Mariam bint Ali bin Nasser Al Misnad is the Qatari Minister of Social Development and Family. She was appointed as minister on 19 October 2021.

Education 
Al Misnad holds an Executive Master's Degree in Strategic Planning and Business Administration (2014) from HEC Paris.

References 

Living people
21st-century Qatari politicians
Qatari politicians
Government ministers of Qatar
Women government ministers of Qatar
Year of birth missing (living people)

HEC Paris alumni